Chad Prince (born July 19, 1979 in Woodbury, New York) is an American soccer coach and former professional player.

Biography

College 
Prince attended the University of Virginia where he majored in psychology. He later attended the University of Texas where he earned a master's degree in educational psychology.  In 2015, he graduated from Adelphi University with an MS in Sport Management.

Professional career 
After graduating from the University of Virginia, Prince signed with the Chicago Fire of Major League Soccer. Prince played in one regular season match for the Fire. He also played for the Milwaukee Rampage and Austin Posse in the A-League.

Coaching career 
Prince's coaching career began in 2004 as the women's coach for the University of Texas - Austin. In 2008, he was named assistant for the Campbell University women's soccer team. He spent two years as head coach of both the men's and women's team at Keystone College, then had a stint as goalkeeper coach at St. Edward's University. He joined Adelphi University as an assistant for the men's team in 2011.

Statistics

Footnotes

External links 
 Profile on Keystone College website

1979 births
Living people
Jewish American sportspeople
Chicago Fire FC players
Milwaukee Rampage players
Major League Soccer players
People from Woodbury, Nassau County, New York
Association football defenders
American soccer players
Soccer players from New York (state)
Sportspeople from Nassau County, New York
USL First Division players
United States men's youth international soccer players
Texas Longhorns women's soccer coaches
Campbell Lady Camels soccer coaches
Adelphi Panthers women's soccer coaches
American soccer coaches
21st-century American Jews